Tianjin, a municipality in China, is also spelled Tientsin.

Tientsin may also refer to:

 Battle of Tientsin, a 1900 battle of the Boxer Rebellion
 Chinese dispatch boat Tientsin, launched in 1863
 Langfang, known as Tientsin Prefecture until 1973
 Tien Tsin, a ship which brought European settlers to Port Walcott, Western Australia
 Tien Tsin Harbour, now Port Walcott
 Tien Tsin, now Cossack, Western Australia, a ghost town

See also
Tianjin Massacre, a massacre of Christians in the late 19th century
Tientsin Conference, series of conferences of Chinese warlords, beginning in 1924
Tientsin Mystic, Chinese TV series